Devin Searcy (born August 25, 1989) is an American professional basketball player who last played for Rasta Vechta of the German ProA.

Professional career
Searcy played for Japanese club Toyama Grouses during the 2011–12 season.

Searcy played for the Philadelphia 76ers during the 2012 preseason but did not make the final cut going into the 2012–13 NBA season.

On November 14, 2012, Searcy signed with BC Triumph Lyubertsy in Russia.

In July 2015, Searcy signed with Rouen Métropole Basket in France.

On November 12, 2015, Searcy signed with s.Oliver Baskets in Germany.

On July 29, 2017 Searcy joined AEK Larnaca of the Cypriot Division A.

On September 6, 2019, he has signed with BCM U Pitești of the Liga Națională. 

On June 30, 2020, he has signed with Falco KC of the Hungarian Basketball League.

On January 11, 2021, he has signed with Start Lublin of the Polish Basketball League.

On July 2, 2021, he has signed with Rasta Vechta of the German ProA.

References

External links
Profile at Eurobasket.com

1989 births
Living people
American men's basketball players
American expatriate basketball people in France
American expatriate basketball people in Germany
American expatriate basketball people in Japan
American expatriate basketball people in Russia
Basketball players from Michigan
BC Zenit Saint Petersburg players
Dayton Flyers men's basketball players
Eisbären Bremerhaven players
Falco KC Szombathely players
People from Romulus, Michigan
Power forwards (basketball)
SC Rasta Vechta players
Start Lublin players
Toyama Grouses players